Van Renterghem is a surname of Dutch-language origin. People with that name include:

 Toine van Renterghem (1885-1967), Dutch international footballer
 Walter Van Renterghem (born 1944), Belgian long-distance runner

See also
 

Surnames of Dutch origin